Lithghean was an Irish saint, of Cluain-mór-Lithghein, in Uí Failghe in Leinster. Broinnfhinn Brecc, daughter of Lughna, and sister of St. Iubhar, was his mother. He was of the Dál Cormaic, and brother of St. Abbán and St. Senach of Cill-mór. His feast-day is 16 January.

References

Medieval Irish saints